Shingled magnetic recording (SMR) is a magnetic storage data recording technology used in hard disk drives (HDDs) to increase storage density and overall per-drive storage capacity. Conventional hard disk drives record data by writing non-overlapping magnetic tracks parallel to each other (perpendicular magnetic recording, PMR), while shingled recording writes new tracks that overlap part of the previously written magnetic track, leaving the previous track narrower and allowing higher track density. Thus, the tracks partially overlap similar to roof shingles. This approach was selected because, if the writing head is made too narrow, it cannot provide the very high fields required in the recording layer of the disk.

The overlapping-tracks architecture complicates the writing process, since writing to one track also overwrites an adjacent track. If adjacent tracks contain valid data, they must be rewritten as well. As a result, SMR drives are divided into many append-only (sequential) zones of overlapping tracks that need to be rewritten entirely when full, resembling flash blocks in solid-state drives. Device-managed SMR devices hide this complexity by managing it in the firmware, presenting an interface like any other hard disk. Other SMR devices are host-managed and depend on the operating system to know how to handle the drive, and only write sequentially to certain regions of the drive. While SMR drives can use DRAM, flash memory, and even a portion of their own platter reserved for use with PMR instead of SMR, as a cache to improve writing performance, continuous writing of large amount of data is noticeably slower than with PMR drives.

History
Seagate started shipping device-managed SMR hard drives in September 2013, stating an increase in overall capacity of about 25% compared to non-shingled storage. In September 2014, HGST announced a 10 TB drive filled with helium that uses host-managed shingled magnetic recording, although in December 2015 it followed this with a 10 TB helium-filled drive that uses conventional non-shingled perpendicular recording. In November 2019, HGST introduced 14 TB and 15 TB drives.

Western Digital, Toshiba, and Seagate have sold SMR drives without labeling them as such, generating a large controversy, as SMR drives behave much more slowly under some circumstances (such as random writes) than PMR drives. Some have even claimed that these may cause data loss. These mislabeling practices were used in both consumer-centric and dedicated data storage HDDs for servers, NASes, RAIDs, and cold storage. A United States class-action suit against Western Digital alleging that the technology is inferior was settled on or before August 27, 2021.

Heavily overlapped (shingled) tracks also appeared earlier in the consumer helical scan video cassette recorders (VCRs) that were popular in the 1980s and 1990s. In Extended Play (EP or SLP) mode, both VHS and Betamax reduced the track pitch by a factor of three. The severe interference from the adjacent tracks was partially mitigated by the use of slant azimuth recording.

Data management
There are three different ways that data can be managed on an SMR drive: device-managed, host-managed and host-aware.

Device-managed
A device-managed or drive-managed drive appears to the host identically to a non-shingled drive. It is not necessary for the host to follow any special protocols. All handling of data, as it relates to the shingled nature of the storage, is managed by the device. Sequential writes are more efficient. In addition, the host is unaware that the storage is shingled.

The disk controller in a device-managed drive internally handles any re-writing required by the special characteristics of a shingled drive, similar to the way a flash memory controller internally handles re-writing required by the special characteristics of flash media.

Until recently, this type of SMR drive was often not labelled by the manufacturer. Its firmware-controlled shingle translation layer operation can be compared to solid-state drives, as LBA addresses do not correlate much to on-disk structure. The append-only zones are very slow for random writing, so writes are first sent to a PMR cache, and the disk moves these data to SMR parts when idle. RAID resilvering tends to overload the cache, sending SMR drives into minutes-long pauses. Faulty firmware (such as WD40EFAX) may also throw an error when asked to read an address never written to. Both behaviors tend to be interpreted as drive failure by the RAID controller.

The zoned nature of SMR also means that the disk suffers from write amplification when garbage collecting, although for hard drives the main problem with writes is speed instead of longevity. Some SMR hard drives support the TRIM command for this reason.

Host-managed
A host-managed device requires strict adherence to a special protocol by the host. Since the host manages the shingled nature of the storage, it is required to write sequentially so as to not destroy existing data. The drive will refuse to execute commands which violate this protocol.

Host-aware
Host-aware is a combination of drive-managed and host-managed. The drive is capable of managing the shingled nature of the storage and will execute any command the host gives it, regardless of if it is sequential or not. However, the host is aware that the drive is shingled, and able to query the drive for fill levels. This allows the host to optimize writes for the shingled nature, while also allowing the drive to be flexible and backwards-compatible.

Protocol 
SMR devices are considered zoned devices, as the storage is divided into zones of usually 256 MiB size. Two sets of specialized commands, ZBC (Zoned Block Commands, ANSI INCITS 536) for SCSI and ZAC (Zoned ATA Commands, ANSI INCITS 537) for SATA are available for SMR devices. They tell the host about whether each zone is PMR or SMR and allow them to address these zones directly. Unless specifically mentioned, the commands are only available on host-aware/-managed devices. The specific commands are:

 REPORT ZONES, for information on disk layout and zone status (such as the write pointer, the last-written position in a sequential zone)
 SMR or similar zones are sequential required on host-managed drives, but sequential preferred on host-aware ones.
 RESET WRITE POINTER, for rewinding the write pointer so a sequential zone becomes empty
 OPEN ZONE, for explicitly declaring access to a zone and locking the associated firmware resources
 CLOSE ZONE, to unlock an opened zone
 FINISH ZONE, fill a zone full and make it readable

Each zone has a range of LBA addresses associated with it, and all LBA-based commands can be used as long as the sequential requirement is followed on host-managed drives.

SMR devices identify themselves per the following:

 Host-aware or device-managed drives are marked as normal block devices (SCSI 00h), so they can be recognized as a normal hard drive.
 A ZONED field shows whether the drive is device-managed, host-aware, or neither. This is found in the SCSI Block Device Characteristics VPD page and the ATA capabilities log page.
 Host-managed drives use a new device type (SCSI 14h). Only ZAC/ZBC-aware computers can detect and use them.

A newer version of the sibling standards, ZAC-2/ZBC-2 is under development. The new version introduces a new type of "domains and realms zoned block devices" that allow for non-contiguous LBAs. The ZONED field has been retired following a proposal from Western Digital.

The zoned interface is also useful for flash storage. ZNS spec has been released by the NVM Express organization.

Software and application 
The higher density of SMR drives, combined with its random-read nature, fills a niche between the sequential-access tape storage and the random-access conventional hard drive storage. They are suited to storing data that are unlikely to be modified, but need to be read from any point efficiently. One example of the use case is Dropbox's Magic Storage system, which runs the on-disk extents in an append-only way. Device-managed SMR disks have also been marketed as "Archive HDDs" due to this property.

A number of file systems in Linux are or can be tuned for SMR drives:

 F2FS, originally designed for flash media, has a Zoned Block Device (ZBD) mode. It can be used on host-managed drives with conventional zones for metadata. 
 Btrfs had ZBD support added in Linux kernel 5.12, and it already writes mostly sequentially due to the CoW nature.
 ext4 can be experimentally tuned to write more sequentially. Theodore Ts'o and Abutalib Aghayev gave a talk in 2017 on their ext4-lazy. Seagate also has a more radical "SMRFFS" extension from 2015 that makes use of the ZBC/ZAC commands.
 For other filesystems, the Linux device mapper has a dm-zoned target that maps a host-managed drive into a random-writable drive. Linux kernels since 4.10 can perform this task without dm. A  from 2019 exposes the zones as files for easier access.

In addition to Linux, FreeBSD has protocol-level support for host-managed SMR drives. , neither Windows nor MacOS supports the ZBC/ZAC commands required for such drives to work.

Dynamic hybrid SMR
While for traditional SMR models each zone is assigned a type at manufacture time, dynamic hybrid SMR drives allow to reconfigure the zone type from shingled to conventional and back by the customer. Adjusting the SMR/PMR setting helps suit the drive to the current workload of "hot" and "cold" data.

See also 
 Heat-assisted magnetic recording (HAMR)
 Log-structured file system, a type of file system optimized for append-only media
 Patterned media
 Two-dimensional magnetic recording

References

External links 
 LSFMM: A storage technology update, LWN.net, April 23, 2013, by Jonathan Corbet
 SMR Impact on Linux Storage Subsystem, HGST, 2014, by Jorge Campello and Adam Manzanares
 Layout optimisation for using XFS on host-managed SMR drives, March 2015
 SMR in Linux Systems, Seagate, March 18, 2015, by Adrian Palmer
 Host-Aware SMR, Seagate, November 10, 2014, by Timothy Feldman
 Addressing Shingled Magnetic Recording drives with Linear Tape File System, SNIA SDC 2013, by Albert Chen and Jim Malina
 Host Managed SMR, SNIA SDC 2015, by Albert Chen, Jim Malina and TK Kato

Specifications 
 ZAC/ZBC version 1 (published 2016)
 T10, Information technology - Zoned Block Commands (ZBC), 2014, Draft revision 1
 T13, Information technology - Zoned Device ATA Command Set (ZAC), Draft revision 5, 2015
 ZAC/ZBC version 2 (under development as of 2020)
 T10, Information technology - Zoned Block Commands - 2 (ZBC-2), 2020, Draft revision 04a
 T13, ZAC-2, PDF unavailable

Computer storage technologies
Hard disk drives